Gudhi Padwa is a spring-time festival that marks the traditional new year for Marathi and Konkani Hindus, but is also celebrated by other Hindus as well. It is celebrated in and around Maharashtra, Goa, Madhya Pradesh and the union territory of Dadra and Nagar Haveli and Daman and Diu on the first day of the Chaitra month, to mark the beginning of the new year according to the lunisolar method of the Hindu calendar. Padava or paadvo comes from the Sanskrit word pratipada, which is the first day of a lunar fortnight. The spring festival is observed with colourful floor decorations called rangoli, a special Gudhi dvaja (a saree or piece of cloth garlanded with flowers, mango and neem leaves, sugar crystal garland called gathi, topped with upturned silver or copper vessels), street processions, dancing, and festive foods.

In Maharashtra, first day of the bright phase of the moon is called gudhi padwa, pādyo (Telugu: పాడ్యమి, paadyami). Konkani Hindus variously refer to the day as सौसार पाडवो or सौसार पाडयो (sausāra pāḍawa / sausāra pāḍye), संसार  (sansāra) being a corruption of the word संवत्सर (sanvastar). Telugu Hindus celebrate the same occasion as Ugadi, while Kannada Hindus in Karnataka refer to it as युगादि, ಯುಗಾದಿ (yugādi). The Sindhi community celebrates this day as Cheti Chand as the new year and observed as the emergence day of Lord Jhulelal. Prayers are offered to Lord Jhulelal and the festival is celebrated by making delicacies like Tahiri (sweet rice) and Sai Bhaji (spinach cooked with a sprinkle of chana dal).

However, this is not the universal new year for all Hindus. For some, such as those in and near Gujarat, the new year festivities coincide with the five day Diwali festival. For many others, the new year falls on Vaisakhi between 13 and 15 April, according to the solar cycle part of the Hindu lunisolar calendar and this is by far the most popular not only among Hindus of the Indian subcontinent but also among Buddhists and Hindus in many parts of southeast Asia.

Etymology

Gudhi means flag, erect flag on the houses as part of celebration in Maharashtra where its mainly celebrated. According to Kittel word belongs to South Indian language origin. The word pāḍavā is derived from the Sanskrit word pratipad for the first day of each fortnight in a lunar month i.e. the first day on which the moon appears after the so-called "new moon" day (amāvāsya) and the first day after the full moon. A Gudhi is also hoisted on this occasion giving this festival its name. The term padva or padavo is also associated with balipratipad the third day of Diwali which is another celebration that comes at the end of the harvesting season.
Also, the people in the Konkan region worship the panchangam (almanac) of the new year.

Significance

Gudhi Padva signifies the arrival of spring and to the reaping of Rabi crops. The festival is linked to the mythical day on which Hindu god Brahma created time and universe. To some, it commemorates the coronation of Rama in Ayodhya after his victory over evil Ravana, or alternatively the start of Shalivahan calendar after he defeated the Huns invasion in the 1st century. According to Anne Feldhaus, in rural Maharashtra the festival is linked to Shiva's dance and coming together of the community as they carry the Gudhi Kavads together to a Shiva temple.

The guḍhī 
A notable sight during Gudhi Padwa are the numerous gudi (or gudhi) arrangements at every household. It is a bright colourful silk scarf-like cloth tied at the top of a long bamboo. On top of it, one or more boughs of neem leaves and mango leaves are attached along with a garland of flowers. This arrangement is capped with a silver, bronze or copper pot (handi or kalash) signifying victory or achievement. The whole arrangement is hoisted outside each household, typically to the right, or through a window or terrace. It is visible to everybody. Villages or neighbourhoods also come together and host a community Gudhi Kavad, which they carry together to the local Shiva temple.

Some temples are located on the top of hills, and groups work together to help reach the kavad to the top.

Some of the significances attributed to raising a Gudhi are as follows:

It symbolises the victory of King Shalivahana and was hoisted by his people when he returned to Paithan.
Gudhi symbolises the Brahmadhvaj (translation: Brahma’s flag) mentioned in the Brahma Purana, because Lord Brahma created the universe on this day. It may also represent Indradhvaj (translation: the flag of Indra).
Historically, the Gudhi symbolises Lord Rama’s victory and happiness on returning to Ayodhya after slaying Ravana. Since a symbol of victory is always held high, so is the gudhi (flag). It is believed that this festival is celebrated to commemorate the coronation of Rama post his return to Ayodhya after completing 14 years of exile.
Gudhi is believed to ward off evil, invite prosperity and good luck into the house.

Festivities

On the festive day, courtyards in village houses will be swept clean and plastered with fresh cow-dung. Even in the city, people take the time out to do some spring cleaning. Women and children work on intricate rangoli designs on their doorsteps, the vibrant colours mirroring the burst of colour associated with spring. Everyone dresses up in new clothes and it is a time for family gatherings.

Traditionally, families prepare a special dish that mixes various flavours, particularly the bitter leaves of the neem tree and sweet jaggery (gur, gul). Additional ingredients include sour tamarind and astringent dhane seeds. This, like the pacchadi recipe used in Ugadi festival, is eaten as a reminder of life's sweet and bitter experiences, as well as a belief that the neem-based mixture has health benefits.

Maharashtrian families also make many other festive dishes, such as shrikhand and Poori or Puran Poli on this day.

Guḍhī Pāḍavā in other languages, states and people
Known as Guḍhī Pāḍavā ("Gudhee Paadavaa") in Maharashtra, this festival is also known as
Bihu among the Assamese of Assam.
Cheti Chand among the Sindhi people
Navreh among the Kashmiri Pandits in Jammu and Kashmir.
 Pahela Baishakh among the Bengalis in West Bengal and Bangladesh.
Puthandu among the Tamils in Tamil Nadu.
Samvatsar Padvo among Hindu Konkanis of Goa and Konkani diaspora in Kerala
Vaisakhi or Baisakhi among the Punjabis in Punjab.
Vishu or  among the Malayalis in Kerala.
Ugadi among the south-Indian states of Karnataka, Andhra Pradesh and Telangana.

It is also celebrated as Sajibu Nongma Panba Cheiraoba in countries like Nepal, Myanmar, Cambodia and other nations where there are lot of Hindus like Singapore and Malaysia. People prepare a variety of food and cuisine on this day and later climb the hillocks in the evening.

In Jammu and Kashmir,, the Kashmiri Hindu or Pundit community, also the Kashmiri Sikh community celebrate this Festival as Navreh, the start of New Lunar Year. A big thal viz a brass eating plate is filled with uncooked rice and the new Panchangam, the Kashmiri Hindu Ephemeris is placed in it. A little cooked rice, curds, salt, all in small cups, a clean Indian rupee note and a coin, a pen, some flowers, a golden bangle, a silver ornament, 3 or 5 walnuts are also placed in this Thal. Every one is expected to see this thal, first thing in the morning. Generally, the eldest lady of the household sees it first and then brings it in to show to all sleeping members of the household. Every one is expected to wear a new garment and the children are given some money to enjoy the festival. The lunch is a feast.

In Punjab, the new year is celebrated as Baisakhi falling mostly on 13 or 14 April, first day of month Baisakh of the Bikram Samavt or calendar.

in West Bengal this occasion is celebrated as Naba Barsha, in Assam as Bihu, in Kerala as Vishu and in Tamil Nadu as Puthandu. It is considered as the most auspicious day of the year.

See also
Astronomical basis of the Hindu calendar
Hindu units of measurement
Panchanga
Shaka era
Vikram Samvat

References

 Meaning of Gudi (Gidhi) and Date and time for 2020 Rudra Centre

Hindu festivals
New Year celebrations
New Year in India
Culture of Maharashtra
Festivals in Maharashtra
March observances
April observances
Hindu festivals in India
Religious festivals in India
Festivals in Andhra Pradesh
Culture of Andhra Pradesh